The 2014 AFC Challenge Cup Final was an association football match between Palestine and the Philippines on 30 May 2014 at the National Football Stadium in Malé, Maldives.

Background
The AFC Challenge Cup was an international football competition for Asian Football Confederation (AFC) nations that was categorized as "emerging countries" in the "Vision Asia" program. It was an idea by former AFC president, Mohammed Bin Hammam which its goal to raise the standards of Asian football at all levels. The AFC Challenge Cup, which reflected the philosophy of "Vision Asia", was created for teams to experience playing in a continental competition with the possibility to win an AFC trophy and potentially discover new talent. It was held in every two years as its inaugural edition took place on 2006 in Bangladesh. This 2014 Challenge Cup was the last season, due to the expansion of participating national teams in the AFC Asian Cup from 16 to 24. Maldives won the hosting rights, with two renovated stadiums (Addu Football Stadium and National Football Stadium) were used as venues in the tournament. The winner qualifies for the 2015 AFC Asian Cup.

The two countries met twice before the finals match. Their first meeting was in the qualification phase of the 2012 AFC Challenge Cup on 23 March 2011 which ended in a goalless draw. While their second match together was at the 2012 AFC Challenge Cup third-place playoff, where the Filipinos won the game, 4–3. That result causes the Philippines to grab their best finish yet in a major tournament and in the Challenge Cup. Michael Weiss, then head coach of the Philippines congratulated his team by "showing their fighting spirit" throughout the game. He later admitted that "[he did not] expected the match to go that way". While, Palestine head coach Jamal Mahmoud described their last game against them was "the worst game that we ever played in international football". Like the Philippines, Palestine also made history as they were the first West Asian team to be in the knockout stage of the tournament. The Philippines were considered the "favorites" heading towards the game. Goal.com predicted that the Filipinos were more likely to beat Palestine in a 2–1 scoreline.

Route to the final

Before going to the main contest proper, all participating countries except Maldives competed in a qualifying round. Twenty nations confirmed their interest to take part in the AFC Challenge Cup qualifiers with Brunei withdrawing a day before the qualifiers citing "unavoidable circumstances". The winner of each group, and the best and better ranked second placed teams qualified for the AFC Challenge Cup proper. The teams in the group stages was trimmed down to eight, with the first and second ranked teams of each group advancing to the knockout stage.

Match

References

Final
2014
2014
2014
2013–14 in Palestinian football
2014 in Philippine football
May 2014 sports events in Asia